Pacific Responder is a Responder-class oil-skimming vessel registered in Norfolk, Virginia and based in San Francisco, California.

Pacific Responder and her sister ship, California Responder, operated off the coast of Louisiana in the Gulf of Mexico during the Deepwater Horizon oil spill. The vessels sailed to the gulf from their home ports in California to assist in the containment efforts.

References

External links
 Pacific Responder current position at VesselTracker
 Pacific Responder vessel information and current position at FleetMon Explorer

Deepwater Horizon oil spill
Service vessels of the United States
1992 ships